Only You is a 2015 Chinese romantic comedy film directed by Zhang Hao and starring Tang Wei and Liao Fan. The film is a remake of 1994's Only You that starred Marisa Tomei and Robert Downey, Jr. The film was released on July 24, 2015.

Cast
 Tang Wei as Fang Yuan
 Liao Fan as Feng Dali
 Su Yan as Li Xiaotang
 Fang Fang
 Liu Tao
 Xie Dongshen

Reception

Critical response
On the review aggregator website Rotten Tomatoes, the film has a 17% approval rating, based on 6 reviews, with an average rating of 4.2/10.

Box office
On the first weekend, the first grossed RMB47.5 million (US$7.64 million).

References

External links
 

2015 films
2015 romantic comedy films
Chinese romantic comedy films
Chinese remakes of foreign films
Huayi Brothers films
Films set in Florence
Films set in Milan
2010s Mandarin-language films